Ilkowice  is a village in the administrative district of Gmina Żabno, within Tarnów County, Lesser Poland Voivodeship, in southern Poland. The village is situated in the Sandomierz Basin on the river Dunajec. In the 1975–98 administrative divisions of the Polish People's Republic (PRL) the village belonged to Tarnów Voivodeship.

History
Ilkowice already existed in the 2nd half of the fourteenth century, because in 1409 according to the chronicles Ilkowice belonged to Vincent Granowski, the son of Vincent Granowa coat Leliwa. There is a small historic church of St. Sebastian representing an eclectic style with elements of baroque and classicism.

References

Villages in Tarnów County